The Gezer calendar is a small limestone tablet with an early Canaanite inscription discovered in 1908 by Irish archaeologist R. A. Stewart Macalister in the ancient city of Gezer, 20 miles west of Jerusalem. It is commonly dated to the 10th century BCE, although the excavation was unstratified and its identification during the excavations was not in a "secure archaeological context", presenting uncertainty around the dating.

Scholars are divided as to whether the language is Phoenician or Hebrew and whether the script is Phoenician (or Proto-Canaanite) or paleo-Hebrew. Koller argued that the language is Northern Hebrew.

Inscription
The calendar is inscribed on a limestone plaque and describes monthly or bi-monthly periods and attributes to each a duty such as harvest, planting, or tending specific crops. 

The inscription, known as KAI 182, is in Phoenician or paleo-Hebrew script:

.
.

Which in equivalent square Hebrew letters is as follows:

This corresponds to the following transliteration, with spaces added for word divisions:

yrḥw ʾsp  yrḥw z
rʿ  yrḥw lqš
yrḥ ʿṣd pšt
yrḥ qṣr šʿrm
yrḥ qṣrw kl
yrḥw zmr
yrḥ qṣ
ʾby [h]

The text has been translated as:
 Two months gathering (October, November — in the Hebrew calendar Tishrei, Cheshvan)
 Two months planting (December, January — Kislev, Tevet)
 Two months late sowing (February, March — Shvat, Adar)
 One month cutting flax (April — Nisan)
 One month reaping barley (May — Iyar)
 One month reaping and measuring grain (June — Sivan)
 Two months pruning (July, August — Tammuz, Av)
 One month summer fruit (September — Elul)
 Abij [ah]

Scholars have speculated that the calendar could be a schoolboy's memory exercise, the text of a popular folk song or a children's song. Another possibility is something designed for the collection of taxes from farmers.

The scribe of the calendar is probably "Abijah", which means "Yah (a shortened form of the Tetragrammaton) is my father". This name appears in the Bible for several individuals, including a king of Judah (1 Kings 14:31). If accurate, then it is the earliest attestation of the name YHWH currently known, predating the Mesha Stele by more than a century.

History 
The calendar was discovered in 1908 by R.A.S. Macalister of the Palestine Exploration Fund while excavating the  ancient Canaanite city of Gezer, 20 miles west of Jerusalem. 

The Gezer calendar is currently displayed at the Museum of the Ancient Orient, a Turkish archaeology museum, as is the Siloam inscription and other archaeological artifacts unearthed before World War I. A replica of the Gezer calendar is on display at the Israel Museum, Israel.

See also
List of artifacts significant to the Bible
List of ancient Near Eastern scribes
List of languages by first written accounts
Archaeology of Israel

References

Further reading
 Albright, W.F. "The Gezer Calendar" in Bulletin of the American Schools of Oriental Research (BASOR). 1943.  Volume 92:16–26.  Original description of the find.
 Koller, Aaron. "Ancient Hebrew מעצד and עצד in the Gezer Calendar," Journal of Near Eastern Studies 72 (2013), 179-193, available at https://repository.yu.edu/handle/20.500.12202/4440.
 Sivan, Daniel "The Gezer calendar and Northwest Semitic linguistics", Israel Exploration Journal 48,1-2 (1998) 101–105. An up-to-date linguistic analysis of this text.
 Dever, William G.  “Gezer”. In The Oxford Encyclopedia of Archaeology in the Near East vol. 2, Editor in Chief Eric M. Meyers, 396–400.  New York: Oxford University Press, 1997.
 Pardee, Dennis. “Gezer Calendar”. In The Oxford Encyclopedia of Archaeology in the Near East vol. 2, Editor in Chief Eric M. Meyers, 396–400.  New York: Oxford University Press, 1997.

External links

 Details of the calendar including transcription and translation. 
 Another translation and a picture of the calendar.

10th-century BC inscriptions
1908 archaeological discoveries
Ancient Israel and Judah
Ancient Near East steles
Archaeological artifacts
Hebrew inscriptions
KAI inscriptions
Earliest known manuscripts by language
Collection of the Istanbul Archaeology Museums
Archaeological discoveries in Israel
Specific calendars